Abdrakhmanovo (Ğabdraxman) is a rural locality (a selo) and the administrative center of Abdrakhmanovskoye Rural Settlement of Almetyevsky District, Tatarstan, Russia. The  population was 1650 as of 2017. There are 19 streets.

Geography 
The village is located on the Zay River, 22 km southeast of Almetyevsk (the district's administrative centre) by road. Taysuganovo is the nearest rural locality.

Ethnicity 
The village is inhabited by Tatars and others.

References 

Rural localities in Tatarstan
Bugulminsky Uyezd